Asintado is a Philippine action political drama television series, directed by Onat Diaz, Lino S. Cayetano, and Trina N. Dayrit, which premiered on ABS-CBN's Kapamilya Gold afternoon block and worldwide on The Filipino Channel on January 15, 2018. The series stars Julia Montes as Ana Dimasalang, a paramedic who became Gael's nurse after saving him in an accident. She becomes entwined in an assassination plot arranged by the del Mundos and Ojedas upon witnessing their plan. The show features an ensemble cast consisting of Shaina Magdayao, Paulo Avelino, Aljur Abrenica, Lorna Tolentino, Agot Isidro, Nonie Buencamino, and Cherry Pie Picache.

Cast

Main Characters 

 Julia Montes portrays two roles:
     as Juliana "Ana" Dimasalang-Del Mundo / Juliana Ramirez: Ana, full of dreams for her family hopes to see her sister Katrina one day. Ana works as a nursing aid for Gael after she saves him from a mining accident. They both fall in love triggering a series of tragic events that impacts Ana, her family and her dreams. She plans to destroy all who are responsible for her loss. She, Xander, Yvonne and all others form an opposition group that will expose all of Salvador Del Mundo's crimes. 
After the Stella identity is exposed, Ana resumes her real identity and actively works to expose Salvador. She reunites with Gael and is overjoyed to learn that Samantha is her long lost older sister Katrina. Unfortunately, Samantha does not accept her and instead blames her for all her unhappiness and disrupting her seemingly charmed life. Ana refuses to give up. After Gael's death, Ana is pregnant with his child and is protected by Hillary and Samantha until she gives birth to a son, JR. In the finale, she rescues her son at the pier after being kidnapped by both Salvador and Natasha and reunite with Samantha before she is shot and wounded by Salvador. Ana is last seen watching Xander's marriage proposal to Samantha, their wedding, and visiting Gael's grave.

     as Stella Dela Torre-Guerrero: A dead ringer for Ana. She was Xander's wife, who left her family and fortune for Xander Guerrero. They lived abroad for 10 years but she passed away from cancer. Her parents had died a few years before her death and left her as the sole heir to the Dela Torre fortune. Stella had no relatives other than her husband Xander with the exception of one business associate of Stella's mother, an eccentric who was tasked to handle the business until Stella returned. No one informed her that Stella had died. Xander simply returned to the Philippines, leaving her fortune, which is now legally his, untouched.

 Shaina Magdayao as Samantha "Sam" Del Mundo-Guerrero / Katrina Ramirez: She is considered as the villain because of her selfish and evil deeds. After the fire that leaves her and her sister as orphans, Samantha is adopted by Hillary and Salvador del Mundo. She was in love with her childhood best friend Gael Ojeda. Samantha leaves for Switzerland to become a jewelry designer. She returns to find Gael and Ana in love and but was not ready to give him up. She witnesses Ana's kidnapping and murder and knows the crime is ordered by Gael's mother, but she keeps quiet and sees the opportunity to get Gael back. She does not know that she holds crucial evidence against her adopted father, given to her for safekeeping by her biological father before he died. She marries Gael but the marriage breaks down as she blames Ana for her marital issues. Samantha tries to kill her sister several times. Samantha suffers much loss when her daughter dies and her marriage ends. She is devastated further when she discovers her father's involvement in her daughter's attempted kidnapping of her daughter that led to the child's death. As she confronts and denounces her father, he disinherits her and tells her that he never loved her and that she was merely a concession for his wife who longed to replace their daughter who had died early. Rejected and devastated, Samantha moves in with her mother who leaves Salvador and joins Ana's camp. Samantha discovers that she is Katrina, Ana's older sister but refuses to renew their relationship. Both reconcile when both become the target of Salvador. After Gael's death, she and Hillary team up to protect Ana, who is pregnant with Gael's child, from Salvador. In the finale, she shields Ana from getting shot twice from Salvador while they protect the newborn JR. After Salvador's death, Sam survives from her gunshot wound and was surprised that she was engaged to Xander and soon they get married as she, Xander and her family are spend time at Gael's grave.
 Paulo Avelino as Gael Del Mundo / Gael Ojeda: Gael is the son of Miranda and Samantha's ex-boyfriend. While Samantha is away in Switzerland, he meets and falls in love with Ana. The Del Mundos and Ojedas don't approve of Ana. Ana disappears after she exposes Senator Del Mundo's connection to a political killings and Gael is confused. He believes his mother's explanation that Ana is a spy planted by Senator Del Mundo's enemies. He turns to Samantha for solace and they get married when she gets pregnant. Their marriage breaks down when they lose their child to crib death, during an attempted kidnapping. When Ana returns into their lives as Stella, Gael is drawn to her, driving Samantha into intense jealousy. Gael slowly realizes the malevolence of his “Panino” and his mother's true relationship with Salvador. They finally reveal that Salvador is Gael's father. Disgusted, Gael decides to join Ana's group to expose their corruption. Gael finally reconciles his relationship with Ana after learning of her true identity. He rescues her several times from Senator Del Mundo's attempts to kill her. Gael is later shot to death by an assassin hired by Salvador and Miranda.
 Aljur Abrenica as Alexander "Xander" Guerrero: Xander loses his father at a young age at the hands of Senator Del Mundo's assassin. Xander wants to get justice for his father and struggles between justice and vengeance. He saves Ana and they fight the Del Mundos and Ojeda family together. He was previously married to Stella Dela Torre, Ana's doppelganger. He agrees for Ana to use his dead wife's identity and wealth to infiltrate the world of the Del Mundos. He is in love with Ana but after Gael's death while protecting Ana, he develops feelings for Samantha. After Salvador's death, he proposes to Samantha and they get married soon after.

Supporting

Recurring

Guest

References

Asintado
Lists of Philippine television series characters
Lists of drama television characters
Lists of soap opera characters by series